Shewanella atlantica is a psychrophilic bacterium from the genus of Shewanella which has been isolated from marine sediment from the Emerald Basin from the Atlantic Ocean near Canada. Shewanella atlantica can degrade hexahydro-1,3,5-trinitro-1,3,5-triazine.

References

Alteromonadales
Bacteria described in 2007